Jean-Claude Mallet (born 25 March 1955) is a Special Adviser to the French Defence Minister and a member of the council of the International Institute for Strategic Studies. He was Secretary-General for National Defence from 1998 to 2004.

Selected publications
 Flaubert à l'œuvre (with Raymonde Debray-Genette and Pierre-Marc de Biasi), Paris, Flammarion, 1993.
 La Défense, de la nation à l'Europe (ed.), Paris, La documentation française, 1996.
 Livre blanc sur la Défense et la Sécurité nationale ed., foreword by Nicolas Sarkozy), Paris, Odile Jacob, 2008.
 Livre blanc sur la Défense et la Sécurité nationale – les débats (ed.), Paris, Odile Jacob, 2008.

References 

École Normale Supérieure alumni
Living people
1955 births
French civil servants